Burn Your Playhouse Down – The Unreleased Duets is the 60th and final studio album by American country music singer George Jones released on August 19, 2008 on the Bandit Records label.  It features duets never before released, including some that were cut from his 1994 duets album The Bradley Barn Sessions.  The only new recording in the collection is "You And Me And Time", a song Jones recorded with his daughter by Tammy Wynette, Georgette.  A music video accompanied the song.  The album features several duets with artist from outside the country music pantheon, including Mark Knopfler, Leon Russell, and Keith Richards.  The album peaked at number 15 on the Billboard country albums chart.  Of the album's title track, Andrew Meuller of Uncut opined in July 2013, "The segue from Richards trying to sing like Jones to Jones actually singing like Jones is hilarious."

Track listing

Personnel

 Brian Ahern – acoustic guitar, electric guitar
 Joe Babcock – background vocals
 Eddie Bayers – drums
 Richard Bennett – acoustic guitar
 Pete Bordonali – electric guitar
 James Burton – electric guitar
 Jimmy Capps – acoustic guitar
 Jerry Carrigan – drums
 Mark Casstevens – acoustic guitar
 Mark Chesnutt – duet vocals on "When the Grass Grows Over Me"
 Jerry Douglas – dobro
 Delores Egdin – background vocals
 Paul Franklin – steel guitar
 Vince Gill – acoustic guitar, electric guitar, and duet vocals on "Selfishness in Man"
 Owen Hale – drums
 Glen D. Hardin – piano
 Emmylou Harris – acoustic guitar
 Randy Howard – mandolin
 John Hughey – steel guitar
 David Hungate – bass guitar
 John Jennings – electric guitar
 Wendy Suits Johnson – background vocals
 George Jones – lead vocals
 Georgette Jones – duet vocals on "You and Me and Time"
 Glenn Keener – electric guitar
 Shane Keister – keyboards
 Jerry Kennedy – electric guitar
 Mark Knopfler – electric guitar and duet vocals on "I Always Get Lucky with You"
 Jim Lauderdale – duet vocals on "Tavern Choir"
 Shelby Lynne – duet vocals on "I Always Get It Right with You"
 Mac McAnally – acoustic guitar
 Terry McMillan – harmonica
 Kenny Malone – drums
 Brent Mason – electric guitar
 Weldon Myrick – steel guitar
 Louis Dean Nunley – background vocals
 Jennifer O'Brien – background vocals
 Mark O'Connor – fiddle
 Clifford Parker – electric guitar
 Dolly Parton – duet vocals on "Rockin' Years"
 Dave Pomeroy – bass guitar
 Keith Richards – electric guitar and duet vocals on "Burn Your Playhouse Down"
 Hargus "Pig" Robbins – piano
 Brent Rowan – electric guitar
 Leon Russell – piano and duet vocals on "Window Up Above"
 Billy Sanford – electric guitar
 Dale Sellers – electric guitar
 Billy Sherrill – keyboards
 Ricky Skaggs – fiddle, acoustic guitar, and duet vocals on "She Once Lived Her"
 Buddy Spicher – fiddle
 Tommy Spurlock – steel guitar
 Harry Stinson – drums
 Henry Strzelecki – bass guitar
 Marty Stuart – electric slide guitar, mandolin, and duet vocals on "You're Still on My Mind"
 Jim Vest – steel guitar
 Bergen White – string arrangements
 John Willis – acoustic guitar
 Bobby Wood – keyboards
 Glenn Worf – upright bass
 Bob Wray – bass guitar
 Tammy Wynette – duet vocals on "Lovin' Me, Lovin' You"

References

2008 albums
George Jones albums
Vocal duet albums
Albums produced by Billy Sherrill
Albums produced by Keith Stegall
Albums produced by Brian Ahern (producer)